Eugen Semitjov (22 May 1923 – 12 June 1987) was a Swedish journalist, author and artist of Russian descent who was born in Sweden.

Background

Semitjov started drawing in 1942 during his Swedish military service.  He was an expert in spacecraft, especially Soviet ones, and worked as a translator from Russian during Juriy Gagarin visit to Sweden. 
He also often worked as an illustrator for Aftonbladet, especially when the subject was related to space technology. He covered the Apollo space program as a journalist in Florida. As a Russian speaker, he got rare interviews with people involved in the Soviet space program. For his journalistic work, Semitjov received Stora Journalistpriset, 'the grand prize for journalism,' in Sweden in 1972.

His non-fiction books covered actress Greta Garbo, science, speculative science such as possible future space colonies, starships using illustrations by known Space artists such as Fred Gambino and David A. Hardy. He also wrote a small number of youth novels. At a time when the belief that aliens visited Earth was common, he published a book on the subject and deliberately gave it a title and cover art to attract the 'true believers,' whereas the majority of the book's content was devoted to debunking a number of well-known UFO cases. 

In addition to writing books, he was the author of the science fiction comic Allan Kämpe, which was first published in December 1942. The stories at first glance seem to be a simple copy of Flash Gordon, but the comic has more in common with Sidney Jordan's 'Jeff Hawke'.

He was a leading member of the Swedish Space Movement Association when it was founded in 1984 to promote interest in space travel in Sweden. In 1991, the association changed its name to the Swedish Space Society and then gradually sleeps during the first half of the 1990s, to bring to life again in 2012. The Swedish space movement instituted after Semitjov's 1987 a prize to his memory called the Eugen Semitjov Prize.

External links
 official homepage

References 

1923 births
1987 deaths
Swedish illustrators
Swedish cartoonists
Swedish comics artists
Swedish-language writers
Swedish people of Russian descent
20th-century Swedish journalists